Thomas F. Koch (born 1942) is a Republican politician who served in the Vermont House of Representatives from 1976-1980 and 1996 to 2014. He represented the Washington-4 Representative District.

References

1942 births
Living people
Republican Party members of the Vermont House of Representatives
Date of birth missing (living people)